Presidential elections were held in São Tomé and Príncipe on 30 July 2006. Incumbent Fradique de Menezes, first elected in 2001, won with more than 60% of the vote, while his main challenger, Patrice Trovoada, son of a former president received just over 38%. The third candidate, Nilo Guimarães, received less than 1% of the vote.

Campaign
Fradique de Menezes was nominated by the Force for Change Democratic Movement – Liberal Party and supported by the Christian Democratic Front and Social Liberal Party. Patrice Trovoada was nominated by the Independent Democratic Action, but also supported by the Democratic Renovation Party, the MLSTP/PSD, the National Union for Democracy and Progress, the Opposition Democratic Coalition, the Social Renewal Party,  the São Toméan Workers Party, the Social Renewal Party and the Union of Democrats for Citizenship and Development.

Results

References

Presidential elections in São Tomé and Príncipe
Sao Tome
Election Presidential
São Toméan presidential election